Edu-Aid in Yongning (云南永宁山区爱心助学行动) is a nongovernmental and nonprofit organization which was founded in 2000 by some local teachers and people who eagerly cared about the underprivileged children in a mountainous area near Lugu Lake. The mission of Edu-Aid in Yongning Township, Ninglang County, Yunnan Province is helping poor children return to the school and improve the local condition of teaching.

To ensure a long-term development, the Program has officially been authorized by Lijiang Charity in July, 2007. The mission is to collect and use the donations from all warmhearted circles to assist the needy children, improve local school conditions, and help the dropouts back to school.

The children being helped are not only from the plain area but also extended to the mountain area of Yongning Township. The education levels cover primary school, high school and university, and the nation cover Mosuo, Yi, Zhuang, Pumi and so on.

Up to September 2005, the project covered 28 schools total 650 children successively.

External links
Website
Forum
Report in 2008
An Issue of Edu-Aid Brief

Educational organizations based in China
Organizations established in 2000